The 1914 DEI Championship season (known as the Koloniale-Tentoonstellings-Beker for organisation reasons) was the inaugural season of the Dutch East Indies DEI Championship football competition since its establishment in 1914.

It was contested by 4 teams, and Batavia won the championship.

Result

Semifinals

Final

Top goalscorers
This a list of top scorers in the 1914 season.

References

External links
N.I.V.B./N.I.V.U./V.U.V.S.I. Stedenwedstrĳden

1914 in Asian football
1914 in the Dutch East Indies
Seasons in Indonesian football competitions
Sport in the Dutch East Indies